Amy Elizabeth Adams (March 28, 1892 – February 15, 1962) was a zoologist and professor at Mount Holyoke College.

Early life and education 
Born in the Delaware section of Knowlton Township, New Jersey, Adams studied biology at Mount Holyoke and the University of Chicago, earning bachelor's degrees in 1914 and 1916. She earned a master's degree from Columbia University in 1919 and a Ph.D. from Yale University in 1926. The title of her thesis, first printed in 1924 in the Journal of Experimental Zoology, was 'An experimental study of the development of the mouth in the amphibian embryo.' Adams also studied for a year from 1930 to 1931 at the University of Edinburgh.

Career 
In 1919, Adams began her career at Mount Holyoke, where she would spend her entire professional life. In 1928, she became a full professor. Adams retired in 1957 and died in 1962 in South Hadley, Massachusetts. She taught embryology and genetics and researched related topics: experimental embryology and endocrinology of the reproductive system. Her studies of the reproductive system were among the first. Adams was funded by a variety of organizations, a rarity for women and women's colleges, throughout her career. She maintained her funding during the Great Depression, another rare accomplishment.

Works 

 'An experimental study of the development of the mouth in the amphibian embryo', Journal of Experimental Zoology, 40, 1924 
 'Studies on life in Triturus viridescens : the effects of ovarian grafts in castrated males',  Journal of Experimental Zoology, 55 (January 1930) 
 'The endocrine glands and molting in Triturus viridescens', Journal of Experimental Zoology, 63:1 (August 1932) 
 'The gonad- and thyroid- stimulating potencies of phyone and hebin', Anatomical Record 59:3 (June 1934) 
 Studies in experimental zoology (regeneration, experimental embryology, endocrinology), 1936 
 (with Beatrice Gray) 'A comparative study of the thyroid glands of hypophysectomized newts after treatment with anterior pituitary, thyroid and iodine', Anatomical Record 65:1 (June 1936)April 1936)  
 (with Florence Martindale) 'The response of thyroid glands of hypophysectomized newts to injections of phyone and their reaction after cessation of treatment', Anatomical Record 65:3 (June 1936) 
 (with Barbara Granger and Ruth Rhoades) 'Stimulation of the thyroid gland of the guinea pig by anuran anterior pituitary', Anatomical Record 72:4 & supplement (December 1938) 
 (with Elizabeth M. DeForest and Barbara Granger) 'Effects of administering mouse anterior pituitary to the newt and the frog', Proceedings of the Society for Experimental Biology and Medicine 42 (1939) 
 'Sexual conditions in triturus viridescens. III, The reproductive cycle of the adult aquatic form of both sexes', American Journal of Anatomy, 66:2 (March 1940)

Professional memberships 
 Elected Fellow, New York Academy of Sciences
 Member, Endocrine Society
 Member, Society for Experimental Biology and Medicine

References

External links 
 A. Elizabeth Adams Papers at Mount Holyoke College 

1892 births
1962 deaths
Women zoologists
20th-century American zoologists
Mount Holyoke College faculty
University of Chicago alumni
Columbia University alumni
Yale University alumni
20th-century American women scientists
People from Knowlton Township, New Jersey